Đặng Xá station is a railway station on North–South railway at Km 81 in Vietnam. It's located in Mỹ Lộc, Nam Định between Cầu Họ station and Nam Định station.

References 

Railway stations in Vietnam